The 2022 Dutch Grand Prix (officially known as the Formula 1 Heineken Dutch Grand Prix 2022) was a Formula One motor race  held on 4 September 2022 at the Circuit Zandvoort in Zandvoort, the Netherlands. The race was won by defending winner Max Verstappen. 

The race ran over a distance of 72 laps and was the 34th overall running of the Dutch Grand Prix and the 32nd time the event has been held as part of the Formula One World Championship, as well as the 32nd World Championship race held at the Circuit Zandvoort.

Background
The event was held across the weekend of the 2–4 September. It was the fifteenth round of the 2022 Formula One World Championship.

Championship standings before the race
Max Verstappen led the Drivers' Championship by 93 points from teammate Sergio Pérez, with Charles Leclerc third, a further 5 points behind. Red Bull Racing team led the Constructors' Championship, leading Ferrari by 118 points and Mercedes by 159 points.

Entrants

The drivers and teams were the same as the season entry list with no additional stand-in drivers for the race.

Tyre choices

Tyre supplier Pirelli brought the C1, C2, and C3 tyre compounds (designated hard, medium, and soft, respectively) for teams to use at the event.

Track changes 
The second DRS activation point was moved further back, being positioned  after turn 13. As a result, the second DRS detection point was moved further back, being established  after turn 12.

Practice
There were three practice sessions. The first two were held on 2 September. The first practice started at 12:30 local time (UTC+02:00) and ended with George Russell fastest, followed by Lewis Hamilton and Carlos Sainz Jr. The second practice session was scheduled to held on 16:00, but was delayed to 16:15 due to two red flag periods during qualifying for the Formula 2 support race. Charles Leclerc was fastest, ahead of Sainz and Hamilton. The third practice session took place on 3 September, starting on 12:00 local time. Leclerc was fastest in the session, followed by Russell and Verstappen.

Qualifying
Qualifying took place on 3 September, starting at 15:00 local time.

Qualifying classification

Race

Race report 
The race took place on 4 September, starting at 15:00 CEST, and lasting 72 laps. Verstappen lead away from pole, with Leclerc, Sainz and Hamilton behind. Kevin Magnussen scraped the barriers on lap 2, demoting him to the back of the field. On lap 18, Carlos Sainz Jr. had a slow pit stop as his tyres were not ready; the mechanics also misplaced the spare wheel gun in an unsafe position which Pérez ran over. The slow pitstop demoted Sainz to eleventh. On lap 45, Yuki Tsunoda's AlphaTauri pulled over with an issue on the front-left tyre. Tsunoda was told to continue and came in a lap later, for a change of tyres and to tighten his seatbelt, which he had loosened as he prepared to abandon his car. On lap 47, Tsunoda retired with a differential issue. This brought out a virtual safety car, allowing Verstappen to make a pit stop to keep the lead ahead of the two Mercedes. On lap 55, Valtteri Bottas retired with an engine issue, bringing out a full safety car. Hamilton stayed out, while Verstappen and Russell pitted for softs. Verstappen overtook Hamilton at the restart almost immediately, while Sainz received a five-second penalty for an unsafe release during his pit stop. After Russell made a split-second decision to pit again for faster softs, he overtook Hamilton, who fell to fourth after being overtaken by Leclerc as well. The final standings saw Verstappen in first place, winning the 30th race in his career and the fourth race in a row, ahead of Russell in second and Leclerc in third. Sainz’s penalty demoted him from fifth to eighth.

Post race 
Following the race, a conspiracy theory emerged accusing Red Bull Racing strategist Hannah Schmitz of conspiring with sister team AlphaTauri to ensure a favourable result for Verstappen, after questioning the nature of Tsunoda's retirement on lap 47 which helped Verstappen take a pit stop with a reduced time loss, due to the virtual safety car. This followed the post-race comments of Mercedes team boss Toto Wolff who openly admitted to being suspicious about the circumstances of Tsunoda's retirement saying he was left "speechless" by the incident and that he may have had inspected the incident more closely had his driver Lewis Hamilton been a realistic contender to win the drivers championship. AlphaTauri responded to the accusations, stating Tsunoda's car had a genuine problem the team was initially not aware of. Media sources also criticised the conspiracy theories surrounding Tsunoda's retirement. The incident was looked into by race stewards, whose only action was to reprimand Tsunoda for having his belts undone.

Race classification 

Notes
  – Includes one point for fastest lap.
  – Carlos Sainz Jr. finished fifth, but he received a five-second time penalty for an unsafe release.
  – Sebastian Vettel finished 13th, but he received a five-second time penalty for ignoring blue flags.

Championship standings after the race

Drivers' Championship standings

Constructors' Championship standings

 Note: Only the top five positions are included for both sets of standings.

See also
 2022 Zandvoort Formula 2 round
 2022 Zandvoort Formula 3 round

References

External links

Dutch
2022
Dutch Grand Prix
Dutch Grand Prix